The Confederated Tribes of the Coos, Lower Umpqua and Siuslaw Indians of Oregon are a federally recognized Native American tribe of Hanis Coos, Miluk Coos, Lower Umpqua (or Kuitsh), and Siuslaw people in Oregon.

Lands
The service area of the Confederated Tribes of the Coos, Lower Umpqua and Siuslaw Indians include lands a five-county area spanning Coos, Curry, Lincoln, Douglas, and Lane Counties.

Government

The Confederated Tribes of the Coos, Lower Umpqua and Siuslaw Indians are headquartered in Coos Bay, Oregon. The tribe is governed by a democratically elected general council, serving four-year terms. The tribal chief serves ten-year terms. The current tribal government leadership is as follows:

 Chief: Don "Doc" Slyter
 Chair:  Debbie Bossley
Vice-Chairman: Mark Petrie
 Councilperson: Enna Helms
 Councilperson: Iliana Montiel
 Councilperson: Doug Barrett
 Councilperson: Josh Davies

Languages
Members of the Confederated Tribes of Coos, Lower Umpqua and Siuslaw speak English. Formerly they spoke the Coos language and Siuslaw language (Siuslaw and Kuitsh dialects), which is a language isolate. The tribe runs a language program to revive Coos and Siuslaw.

Economic development
The Confederated Tribes of Coos, Lower Umpqua and Siuslaw owns and operates:

 Three Rivers Resort, a Class 3 Facility in Florence, Oregon.
 Three Rivers Casino, a Class 2 Facility in the Empire District of Coos Bay, Oregon.
 Blue Earth Services and Technology

History
The tribes did not have contact with Europeans until 1792. In 1828, Lower Umpqua (Kuitsh) people massacred members of the Jedediah Smith Party and attacked the Hudson's Bay Company's fort in 1838. Most of their population died in the epidemics which followed European contact.

In 1860 the remnants of these and other tribes were forced onto the Siletz Reservation. The reservation was split into three parts, with one section being opened to non-native settlement and another becoming the Alsea Reservation, which was opened to non-native settlement in 1875.

The Confederated Tribes of Coos, Lower Umpqua and Siuslaw formally organized in 1916. They adopted their first constitution in 1938 and ratified their current constitution in 1987.

Notes

References
 Pritzker, Barry M. A Native American Encyclopedia: History, Culture, and Peoples. Oxford: Oxford University Press, 2000.

External links
Confederated Tribes of Coos, Lower Umpqua and Siuslaw Indians, official website
 Constitution of the Confederated Tribes of the Coos, Lower Umpqua and Siuslaw Indians, Native American Rights Fund

Coos tribe
Native American tribes in Oregon
Federally recognized tribes in the United States
Indigenous peoples of the Northwest Plateau
Coos County, Oregon
Curry County, Oregon
Douglas County, Oregon
Lane County, Oregon
Lincoln County, Oregon